is a Japanese television jidaigeki or period drama that was broadcast from 1989 to 2016. It is based on Shōtarō Ikenami's novel of the same title. Kichiemon Nakamura plays Heizō Hasegawa. Kichiemon Nakamura`s father Matsumoto Kōshirō VIII also played same role in 1969. In 1995 the drama made into a movie.(Onihei's Detective Records directed by Yoshiki Onoda.)

Plot
Hasegawa is a chief of Hitsuke Tōzoku Aratamegata. He is a talented man and feared like an oni by thieves. On the other hand, he is a man with big heart, and some former thieves impressed by his personality are now working for him. Hasegawa and his subordinates help each other to arrest thieves.

Characters
Kichiemon Nakamura as Heizō Hasegawa
Meiko Kaji as Omasa
Keizō Kanie as Kumehachi
Yumi Takigawa as Hisae
Toshinori Omi as Kimura Chūgo(Usagi)
Etsushi Takahashi as Sashima Tadasuke
Kōichi Miura as Isaji
Saburō Shinoda (Season 1)/Toshio Shiba (Season 2)/Hiroshi Katsuno (from Season 3) as Sakai Yūsuke
Teruyuki Kagawa (Season1-2) as Koyanagi
Edoya Nekohachi as Sagami no Hikojyū
Baku Numata as Muramatsu(Neko Dono)

Seasons
Season1 26episodes
Season2 18 episodes
Season3 19 episodes
Season4 19 episodes
Season5 13 episodes
Season6 11 episodes
Season7 16 episodes

TV Specials
Kyoken, guest starring Hisashi Igawa (1989)
Ryusei, guest starring Hiroshi Inuzuka (1990)
Tonosama Eigoro, guest starring Ichirō Nakatani, Hiroyuki Nagato (1990)
Unryūken, guest starring Shigeru Tsuyuguchi, Yū Fujiki (1990)
Atami miyage no Takaramono, guest starring Chosuke Ikariya (1991)
Futari Gorozo, guest starring Kantarō Suga, Ittoku Kishibe (1993)
Hebiichigo no Onna, guest starring Akira Nakao (1995)
Meiro, guest starring Raita Ryu, Renji Ishibashi (1995)
Onibi (1998)
Saraba Onihei Hankachō (1998)
Ohkawa no Inkyo, guest starring Hideji Ōtaki (2001)
Yamabukiya Okatsu, guest starring Isao Hashizume, Sei Hiraizumi (2005)
Kyōzoku, guest starring Nenji Kobayashi, Ren Osugi, Shigeru Kōyama (2006)
Ippon Mayu, guest starring Kenichi Endō, Shōhei Hino, Ken Utsui (2007)
Hikikomi Onna, guest starring Kimiko Yo, Matsumoto Kōshirō X (2008)
Amabiki no Bungorō, guest starring Jun Kunimura, Shirō Itō
Takahagi no Sutegorō, guest starring Shōhei Hino, Masahiko Tsugawa (2010)
Issun no Mushi, guest starring Rentarō Mikuni, Yasufumi Terawaki (2011)
Tōzoku Konrei, guest starring Ken Matsudaira (2011)
Dojyou no Wasuke Shimatsu, guest starring Renji Ishibashi, Atsuo Nakamura, Miki Sakai, Susumu Terajima (2013)
Mihari no Ito, guest starring Katsuo Nakamura (2013)
Mikkoku, guest starring Reiko Takashima (2015)
Onihei The Final 1 Gonenme no Kyaku (2016), starring Shōsuke Tanihara and Mayumi Wakamura
Onihei The Final 2 Unryūken (2016), starring Isao Hashizume and Sei Hiraizumi

Film
Onihei's Detective Records (1995 105 minutes) directed by Yoshiki Onoda, screen play by Tatsuo Nogami. Etsushi Takahashi made his final film appearance in the film.

Guest starring
Shima Iwashita as Otoyo
Makoto Fujita as Shirako no Kikuemon
Renji Ishibashi as Oki Genzō
Masanori Sera as Yougorō
Kenichi Endō as Bunkichi
Tōru Minegishi as Hebi no Heijyou
Hirotarō Honda as Keichigoro

See also
Onihei Hankachō
Onihei Hankachō(1975 TV)

References

1989 Japanese television series debuts
1980s drama television series
Jidaigeki television series